This is a list of the equipment used by the Comorian Army.

References 

 
Comoros